Bishop Isidore Borecky (1 October 1911 in Ostrivets, Austro-Hungarian Empire (present day in Ternopil Raion, Ternopil Oblast, Ukraine) – 23 July 2003 in Toronto, Ontario, Canada) was a Ukrainian-born Canadian Ukrainian Greek Catholic hierarch. He served as the Titular Bishop of Amathus (until 3 November 1956) and the first Eparchial Bishop of the new created Ukrainian Catholic Eparchy of Toronto from 17 January 1948 until his retirement on 16 June 1998 (until 10 March 1951 with title of Apostolic Exarch of Eastern Canada; and until 3 November 1956 with title of Apostolic Exarch of Toronto).

Life
Bishop Borecky was born in the Ukrainian peasant family in Halychyna. After the school and gymnasium education, he subsequently studied philosophy and theology in the Greek Catholic Theological Academy in Lviv (1932–1936) and Ludwig Maximilian University in Munich, Germany (1936–1938). Borecky was ordained as a priest on July 17, 1938. In the same year he went to Canada for the pastoral work and here he had a various pastoral assignments and served as parish priest in the parishes of Apostolic Exarchate of Canada.

On January 17, 1948, Fr. Borecky was nominated by Pope Pius XII and on May 27, 1948 consecrated to the Episcopate as the Titular Bishop of Amathus and Apostolic Exarch of Apostolic Exarchate of Eastern Canada. The principal consecrator was Archbishop Basil Ladyka.

Bishop Borecky was a one among co-founders of the Ukrainian Catholic Association "Sviata Sofia". He retired on June 16, 1998 and died on July 23, 2003 in the age 91.

References

1911 births
2003 deaths
People from Ternopil Oblast
People from the Kingdom of Galicia and Lodomeria
Ukrainian Austro-Hungarians
Ukrainian expatriates in Canada
Naturalized citizens of Canada
Canadian bishops
Canadian Eastern Catholics
20th-century Eastern Catholic bishops
21st-century Eastern Catholic bishops
Bishops of the Ukrainian Greek Catholic Church
Canadian members of the Ukrainian Greek Catholic Church
Canadian people of Ukrainian descent
Ludwig Maximilian University of Munich alumni
Participants in the Second Vatican Council